The Antonov An-71 (NATO reporting name: Madcap) was a Soviet AWACS aircraft intended for use with VVS-FA (Fighter Bomber) forces of the Soviet Air Force, developed from the An-72 transport. Only three prototypes were built before the program was cancelled.

Background

Soviet Air Force AWACS doctrine 
Prior to the fall of the Soviet Union, the Air Force was divided into three aircraft based groups of units. They were the VVS-DA (Voenno-Vozdushnye Sily Dal'naya Aviatsiya) or Long Range Aviation (Bombers), the VVS-FA (Voenno-Vozdushnye Sily Frontovaya Aviatsiya) or Frontal Aviation (Fighters, Fighter Bombers and Attack aircraft), and the VVS-VTA (Voenno-Vozdushnye Sily Voenno-Transportnaya Aviatsiya) or Military Transport Aviation. The PVO (Voyska protivovozdushnoy oborony or Voyska PVO) which was the primary fighter / interceptor and surface-based defensive force was not part of the VVS; as a result, the A-50 Mainstay AWACS aircraft and its predecessor the Tu-126 Moss served exclusively with the Voyska PVO and did not assist in the direction of  tactical aircraft. The An-71 was designed to be used overland to support the VVS-FA in tactical operations. This doctrine of each force having its own AWACS planes is contrary to most Western air forces' use of land based AWACS aircraft; this doctrinal difference lead in part to the fallacy that the An-71 was designed to be used by the Soviet Navy on its aircraft carriers.

Development 

Its design was based on An-72, with a completely redesigned rear fuselage supporting the radar dome (rotodome) atop the broad-chord forward-swept fin. The cargo hold contained the electronic equipment and six operators stations.

Development never progressed past the prototype stage, the first of which flew on 12 July 1985. The program was cancelled with the fall of the Soviet Union when issues with the radar Vega-M Kvant could not be resolved.

In 2010, one example was transferred to the Ukraine State Aviation Museum for restoration and display.

Carrier-based variant 
The An-71 Madcap is often erroneously cited as a carrier-based AWACS aircraft, which it was not, as is already described above under AWACS doctrine.  However, a highly modified design, the An-75, was proposed for use on the Soviet aircraft carriers under construction, but the AV-MF (Soviet Naval Aviation) cancelled its development when it was realized that too much of a redesign would be needed to make the An-75 safe to operate off any of the proposed aircraft carriers.  The AV-MF decided to seek a second purpose-built AWACS proposal using an improved Kvant-M version of the existing An-71/An-75's Kvant Radar by the Vega-M design bureau. The An-75 would have had engines mounted under the wing rather than above, similar to the later An-74TK-300, and would have had many other structural and aerodynamic changes. In the end, the An-75 would have shared only slight commonality with the An-71/An-72 aircraft families and was deemed too costly to continue, considering the clean-sheet design of the Yak-44E.

Export 
In the early 2000s, Ukraine unsuccessfully negotiated with India on the sale of an An-71, priced at US$200 million.

Operators

 Soviet Air Force

Specifications (An-71)

See also

References

Further reading 
 Gunston, Bill. The Osprey Encyclopaedia of Russian Aircraft 1875–1995. London: Osprey, 1995. .

External links

 An-71 Article, Images
 Specs at globalsecurity.org
 An-71 at Antonov's website (accessed 2016-05-14)
 Brief description of Kvant radar, in Overscan's guide to Russian Avionics website (accessed 2016-05-15)

An-071
Antonov An-071
Aircraft first flown in 1985
Twinjets
Engine-over-wing aircraft